Lego Castle was a Lego medieval and fantasy environment featuring knights and castles. It was introduced in Europe in 1978 and North America in 1981, and was supported continuously until 1999. It was also the name of a Lego theme within that environment from 1987 to 1991, and the name was reused for two other, single-theme environments, one from 2007 to 2009 and the other in 2013. Other medieval Lego themes have included Knights Kingdom, Knights Kingdom II, and Kingdoms, and are included here. Lego Castle sets were marketed under the Legoland banner until 1991. Lego decided to change and add Lego System in 1992.

"Classic" Castle (1978–1983)

The Castle period from 1978 to 1983 predates themes or factions, and is often known as "Classic" Castle. 375 Castle (often called the Yellow Castle) is the most well known set from this time. Often known by fans as "Original Castle", the knights featured unique movable visor pieces, with eye slits, and a crest that runs backwards from the frontward-facing part of the visor along the helmet. These knights also wore a coat of arms (either a tunic or breastplate) over their body. It was not again until 1990 when knights came with movable visors and armor breastplates, as the knights between 1984 and 1989 had solid grill helmets while their "armor" was just a texture on their body. As there were no horse-specific pieces, horses were built entirely of bricks.

Different factions (1984–1999) 
In 1984, Lego released the first Castle sets that had more realistic castles, knights, and colors (such as gray castles rather than yellow) that more accurately depicted the Middle Ages compared to the Classic Castle sets from the late 1970s and early 1980s.

The 1984 castle sets featured many newly introduced pieces and weapons. Examples are: one-piece horse, horse saddles, new knight helmets with fixed visors, feather plumes (there were three types in five colors: red, blue, yellow, white and black), waving flags and bows and arrows. Many of these new pieces would be included in future castle sets. The 1990 castle sets brought a further changes – as knights now had armor breastplates and helmets with movable visors.

Black Falcons (1984–1994?) 
The sets that were released during this time period predominantly featured the motif of a black and white bird against a black and white background, split down the middle. The minifigures that were associated with this symbol almost invariably had black pants, black helmets, and blue torsos with black sleeves, often with the bird emblem on their chests and shields (with a blue or gold border). Some fans in the United States have labeled this faction as "Black Falcons", and Australian fans have called them "Eagle Crest", though at the time each term only appears once in any official Lego literature – both in regional names for set 6074. A 1989 US catalogue includes an ambiguous reference to the "Guardians of the Gray Castles". However, the faction was never labeled as anything other than "Castle", nor was it ever officially recognized as a theme. Although the term Black Falcons wasn't explicitly and internationally used to market the faction in its original incarnation, Lego later picked up the term in its own marketing to refer to the earlier theme.
 
In 1984, the first Black Falcons castle was 6073 Knight's Castle. It came with six minifigures; two archers, two spearmen, and two knights mounted on horses. Like the yellow castle, the set featured special hinge pieces that could open up the castle to take a look inside and get at the interior. The Black Falcons were also featured in other sets the same year such as 6021 Jousting Knights and 6030 Catapult. In 1986, the Knight's Castle was replaced by similar-sized 6074 Black Falcon's Fortress ("Draco and the Black Knight" in the UK, "Eagle Crest Castle" in Australia), which had the same type of minifigures (including the two mounted knights). The main difference was in the structure as the two defense towers had been moved to the front, and were made with more rounded (octagonal) corner pieces, leaving room in the back for a small roofed residence/chapel with a yellow Tudor wall. 6074 was quite unique because it was the first set to include the octagonal corner pieces and the yellow Tudor wall, as well as the only set to have a blue Black Falcons flag.

Although no new Black Falcons-specific sets would be released after that, Black Falcon figures would appear as guests in other sets, such as the Black Knights' 6059 Knights Stronghold (1990) and 6057 Sea Serpent (1992). Thus the Black Falcons were one of the longest-lived factions from 1984 to 1994, when the last sets with their minifigures were discontinued.

6059 Knights Stronghold featured the Black Falcons attacking a gate defended by the Black Knights, which implied that the two factions had been at war with each other. 6062 Battering Ram featured the Black Falcons defending a castle wall section from a Crusader siege, also implying armed conflict between these two sides. Catalogue dioramas in the late 1980s also showed the 6074 Black Falcon's Fortress under siege by the Forestmen.

Lego has re-released some old Black Falcon sets. Examples are 6062 Battering Ram, 6067 Guarded Inn, 6103 Castle Mini Figures, and 6059 Knight's Stronghold. In 2002, at the request of fans, Lego re-released the Black Falcon's Fortress re-numbered (#10039) as a Lego Legend which was almost identical to the 1986 set: the horse saddles had two clips instead of one, the shield ornament on the minifigures' breastplates was slightly different in shape, and the small Black Falcon flag has a slightly different print.

Crusaders / Lion Knights (1984–1992)

The sets that would eventually form the basis of the Crusaders were released the same year as the Black Falcons in 1984. The Crusaders shield had either a blue lion against a yellow background or a yellow lion against a blue background, both with a red border. The mini-figures that were associated with these shields invariably had blue or red pants and red torsos with blue sleeves, and their helmets were usually gray. They had shield-like emblems on their torsos, one which was a yellow lion set against blue, while the other emblem had the crossed axes (two black and gold axes crossing each other against a black and gold background, split down the middle, with a red border). A few of these sets were later inducted into the Crusaders theme, so some fans retroactively consider all such sets to be Crusaders sets. As with the Black Falcons, Lego never officially named this faction for some time, although catalogues in Australia used the name Lion Knights while Canada used Lion Crest. The 1992 United States and Canadian catalogue officially established the faction as the Crusaders.

Over the years, Crusaders were included in many sets along with the Black Falcons, Forestmen, and Black Knights. Examples include the 6067 Guarded Inn in 1986, 6103 Castle Mini Figures in 1988, and 6060 Knights' Challenge, a set that was the successor after the 1979 6083 Knights' Tournament, in 1989 (ten years later).

An unusual Crusaders set was the 6041 Armor Shop in 1986, which was the only set to have the rare black short sword and a Crusaders Flag.

The first castle under the Crusaders was 6080 King's Castle. This castle was one of the largest Lego Castle sets produced. Four mounted knights and eight soldiers/guards were included. The walls of the castle could be opened to play inside the castle.

The second and last Crusaders castle released was 6081 King's Mountain Fortress in 1990. This was one of the first sets to feature the newly invented knight helmet visor and armor pieces. Crossbows and glow in the dark ghost were also new pieces introduced. The King's Mountain Fortress was also the first Lego castle to be mounted on a raised "ramp and pit", baseplate which had debuted the previous year in the pirates set Eldorado fortress and would feature in many subsequent Lego Castle, Pirates, and even Space sets. Two exclusive elements the set included a princess and a black-colored bird. A small Crusader-style set, King's Catapult appears to be the only Lego castle set to be released in 1991. Finally, the last Crusaders-style set produced was 1463 Treasure Cart released in 1992, another small set that included a soldier pulling a treasure chest on a cart.

In 2001, Lego re-released the well-known Guarded Inn, re-numbered (#10000) as a Lego Legend. The set consisted of two Crusaders, a mounted Black Falcon, and an inn keeper. This set was the only structure to include red Tudor walls. One change in the reissue was the horse saddle had two clips instead of one for holding weapons. Since 1984, Lego Castle had horse saddles with a single clip (except the horse barding saddles) at one side until 1992 when that was changed to two clips.

The Crusaders were in open conflict with the Forestmen, as shown by several catalogue dioramas. 6062 Battering Ram featured the Black Falcons defending a castle wall section from a Crusader siege, implying armed conflict between these two sides, while the US name for set 6021, "Jousting Knights", implied a friendly rivalry between those two factions. Sets such as 6060 Knights' Challenge and 1584 Knight's Challenge suggested that the Lion Knights had a respected sporting rivalry with the Black Knights. The 1992 United States catalogue described the Crusaders as "the bravest knights in the kingdom" and "protectors of the innocent and the keepers of justice", while establishing the Black Knights as "a powerful force" that "will not back down from any conflict", while an advertisement in the United Kingdom showed the Crusaders and Black Knights at war allowing the Wolfpack to sneak in.

Forestmen (1987–1992)

The Forestmen theme was introduced in 1987 when Lego Castle released the first Forestmen set 6066 Camouflaged Outpost. This set was a hideout that featured a large tree adjacent to a cave where the Forestmen lived. The interior of the set could be opened to see inside the cave and enabled more play. The set included six Forestmen minifigures, the most Forestmen minifigures in a single set. This set was also one of the first sets to have a brown colored horse. In 1988, the 6054 Forestmen's Hideout was released; it was a small tree hideout that housed two Forestmen. The following year, the 6077 Forestmen's River Fortress, which was the largest Forestmen set, was released. This hideout was an abandoned castle covered with trees, vines and leaves, where it was surrounded by a moat. It included five Forestmen, and a Lion Knight paddling a raft.

In 1990, the last original Forestmen hideout set, 6071 Forestmen's Crossing, was released. This set had a unique baseplate of a small stream printed on it with white dots marked on the studs to indicate where to place the pieces. The set featured an old tower and a large tree which were connected by a rope bridge that ran across the stream. This was the only set to include a Forestwoman minifigure and was only released in North America. A few Forestmen were included in other small non-Forestmen Castle sets, such as 6103 Castle Mini Figures. At the end of 1992, the Forestmen were discontinued as a faction, along with the Crusaders.

The Forestmen were considered the foes to the other factions who had knights and castles, such as the Crusaders, Black Falcons, and Black Knights. Some have suggested that the Forestmen could be compared to Robin Hood and his outlaws, while the Lion Knights (with their Lion Crest) represented King John and the English throne. (In legends, Robin Hood did support King Richard the Lionhearted who led one of the Crusades, but after Richard's younger brother John succeeded to the throne Hood was declared an outlaw.)

In 1996, a similar theme called Dark Forest was released, which featured an amoral band of forest outlaws.

Black Knights (1988–1994)

Much like the Crusaders, the Black Knights were based on earlier, non-theme-affiliated sets, some of which were retrospectively included in the faction. Officially launched in 1992, the Black Knights are characterized by a red, yellow, and blue wyvern dragon symbol which is only shown on their shield or flag; unlike the other factions the Black Knights never wore the emblem on their chests.

The first well-known Black Knights-style set released was 6085 Black Monarch's Castle in 1988, which was also the largest Black Knights set ever released. The enormous black castle was effectively an upgraded successor to the Crusaders' 6080 King's Castle, with the same general layout and the same complement of soldiers – four archers, four axe- / spearmen, and four knights on horseback. Like 6080, 6085 could be opened and closed using special "hinge" pieces, and snapped closed using a peg and hole mechanism; for 6085 this enabled it to combine with Knight's Stronghold and Black Monarch's Ghost (see below) to create even bigger super-castles. The big difference was that 6085 had black and grey bricks and octagonal turrets, compared to 6080's all-grey scheme and rectangular towers, while 6085 was also among the first sets to include the horse armor barding.

In 1989, three Black Knights-style figures were included in the 6060 Knights' Challenge set. Two more Black Knights-style sets were released in 1990; one was the 6059 Knights Stronghold town gate set that featured one mounted knight, four soldiers, along with a big catapult, and 6034 Black Monarch's Ghost, a set that included a lone mounted knight and a glow-in-the-dark ghost. Like the 6081 King's Mountain Fortress, Knights Stronghold and Black Monarch's Ghost featured the newly invented helmet visor and armor breastplate pieces for the mounted knights. These two sets were also among the last Lego Castle sets to carry the Legoland banner. The two 1990 castle sets were re-released in 1992 with the Lego System banner on the boxes, but the instruction booklets of the sets still had the Legoland banner. The only changes that were made to the 1992 re-release sets were the horse saddles. The saddles were changed from one clip to two clips since 1992 was the year that introduced the altered Lego horse saddle.

When the Black Knights were officially launched in 1992, the 6086 Black Knights Castle (known as Dungeon Master's Castle in Canada and the US for 1992–93) was released to replace Black Monarch's Castle. Two other main Black Knights sets were released the same year as the Black Knights Castle in 1992. They were the 6057 Sea Serpent (the biggest Lego Castle boat ever released in the 1990s) and 6009 Black Knight, a small set that included a single, full armored knight, along with the new dragon plume and shield accessories. A number of new accessories were created for the three new sets, including a new oval shaped shield with a different dragon design usually carried by mounted knights, new dragon plumes available in four different colors (just like the feather plumes) which added side dragon wing plumes to the movable visors on knight helmets. These sets, along with Wolfpack, were the first castle sets to have minifigures with mustache and beard faces. The older dragon triangular shield was still used in the sets for infantry and guards. Older sets such as the Knights Stronghold and Black Monarch's Ghost were retroactively included as part of the Black Knights.

Like the Black Falcons and Crusaders, the Black Knights were in conflict with the Forestmen. The Crusaders and Black Knights were featured together in only one set, the 1584 Knight's Challenge. As the 6059 Knights Stronghold featured the Black Falcons attacking a Black Knights structure, suggested that the two factions were rivals. The Black Knights were also opponents to the Wolfpack Renegades (the 1992 catalogue diorama shows Black Knights soldiers pursuing a Wolfpack Renegade wagon, while the Black Knight's Castle contains a Wolfpack figure as a prisoner) and Dragon Masters (the 1993 catalogue diorama shows Majisto the Wizard on a dragon engaging two mounted Black Knights).

The Black Knights and Dragon Masters coexisted for two years, 1993–94, despite using the same dragon shape on their shields in a similar color pattern, with red wings against a yellow background. This could make them difficult to tell apart. However, on the large oval shields, the Black Knights' dragon was blue, whereas the Dragon Masters' dragon was green. The Black Knights' small triangular shields had a third color scheme entirely (blue dragon with yellow wings against a red background), while the Dragon Masters did not use the small triangular shields at all.

The Black Knights series continued until the end of 1994 when they were superseded by the Royal Knights in 1995. One of the last Black Knights sets released was 1917 King's Catapult in 1993, a miniset that included a knight who manned a tiny catapult. It was re-released in 1998.

Wolfpack Renegades (1992–1993)

The Wolfpack Renegades were a group of bandits in the Lego Castle world. Only three sets were made, making it the smallest Castle faction. Their main hideout was 6075 Wolfpack Tower that included three renegades and a ghost.

The Wolfpack was one of the official opponents of the Black Knights during its short run, as the 1992 catalogue diorama shows Black Knights soldiers pursuing a Wolfpack Renegade wagon, while the Black Knight's Castle contains a Wolfpack figure as a prisoner. Wolfpack soldiers would also be guests in Dragon Masters sets (see below). Unlike the Forestmen who were never stated as being good or evil, most Lego literature implied that the Wolfpack were amoral outlaws.

Dragon Masters (1993–1995)
The Dragon Masters collection was released in August 1993, making it the first time that Lego Castle had a fantasy faction with magic and mythical creatures. Led by Majisto the Wizard (known as Merlin the Wizard outside of the U.S.) the Dragon Masters organization seemed to have the goal of capturing and taming (for use in battle) fire breathing green dragons with red wings. The new dragon animal figure had points of articulation at the jaw, arms, wings, and the tail, with studs on their back to carry a minifgure as a rider, while a flame could inserted near the tip of its mouth. Dragon Masters also introduced new knight helmets, halberds, faces, and the Wizard's glow-in-the-dark wand. The Dragon Masters shield emblem was identical to the ovoid shields of the Black Knights except they featured a green dragon instead of the blue dragon. The largest Dragon Masters set was the 6082 Fire Breathing Fortress, followed by 6076 Dark Dragon's Den, and then 6048 Majisto's Magical Workshop. Interestingly the total number of dragons included in the entirety of Dragon Masters sets was three; besides 6082 and 6076 the only other set containing a dragon was 6056 Dragon Wagon; due to the inclusion of the dragon these sets featured less minifigures and horses than other similar-sized sets in Lego Castle.
 
In Europe and Asia, a total of seven Dragon Masters sets were released in 1993. But in North America, only four sets were released that same year. The remaining three sets – 6020 Magic Shop, 6043 Dragon Defender, and 6105 Medieval Knights – were released in 1994. One possible reason why this occurred was because in 1994, no new castle sets were planned to be released. Therefore, it was decided that these sets would fill in the gap. Other smaller Dragon Masters sets were released in 1994, such as 1906 Majisto's Tower and 1794 Dragon Master Chariot but they were only mini castle sets. In 1995 the last Dragon Masters set released was 1736 Wizard's Cart that featured Majisto with a treasure chest, which marked the end of the Dragon Masters reign. Nonetheless, this faction inspired other castle sets to have magic and fantasy themes such as the Fright Knights.

The Dragon Masters were in conflict with the Black Knights, as shown in the 1993 and 1994 catalogue dioramas, and Wolfpack who were often guests in Dragon Masters sets. In 1995 which was their last year of release the Dragon Masters are seen confronting newly launched Royal Knights, and the two sides are shown battling each other in the 1996 Lego Idea Book (even though the Dragon Masters were already discontinued).

Royal Knights (1995–1996)
The Royal Knights were the first Lego theme to have skeletons, starting with the first ever skeleton set "Skeleton Surprise". Their leader was the Royal King. Their largest set was the 6090 Royal Knight's Castle. This faction also introduced the fan favorite silver longsword, which is used by the Royal King.

Dark Forest (1996)
The Dark Forest faction is similar to Forestmen, almost as a reboot of the former team, and uses the same shields and iconography. With only three sets released it ties with Wolfpack for the smallest Castle faction ever, and the largest set was 6079 Dark Forest Fortress. This theme was only released in North America.

Fright Knights (1997–1998)
The Fright Knights were a faction of soldiers that were not ruled by a king, but instead by Basil, the 6007 Bat Lord. The Fright Knights Lego Sets delved deeper into the supernatural "Fantasy" aspect of Lego, featuring black dragons with fire-colored wings, creepy trap-filled red-and-black castles, crystal balls and Willa the Witch, a dark sorceress who was the real power behind Basil's throne. Their headquarters was the 6097 Night Lord's Castle.

Later environments similar to or based on Castle

Knights' Kingdom (2000)
A completely new environment with no relation to Castle, but filling its place, Knights' Kingdom centered on a conflict involving the Lions, led by King Leo, and the Bulls, led by outlaw Cedric The Bull. This theme had many small sets with minifigures, and was the first Castle theme to feature two female minifigs, Queen Leonora and Princess Storm. The Lion shields were similar to those of the Royal Knights. The Lions castle was 6098 King Leo's Castle, while the Bulls did not have a castle.

A game, titled Lego Creator: Knights' Kingdom, was released in late 2000 by Lego Software and allowed the player to create their own kingdoms based on the theme.

Much like with the Lego Adventurers line, the characters, weapons, castle and others made a special appearance in Lego Island 2: The Brickster's Revenge, which would be the first island that Pepper Roni would visit outside Lego Island itself. where even the Bulls had their own castle. The set 10176 King's Castle used the shield crests of this theme, but was released in 2006 as part of the Knight's Kingdom II product line.

4801/4811/1287 Defense Archer
Minifigs: Richard the Strong
4806 Axe Cart
Minifigs: Weezil
4807/1288 Fire Attack
Minifigs: Cedric the Bull
4816 Knight's Catapult
Minifigs: Richard the Strong, Princess Storm
4817 Dungeon
Minifigs: Lion Knight, Skeleton
4818 Dragon Rider
Minifigs: Cedric the Bull
Animals: Dragon
4819 Rebel Chariot
Minifigs: Gilbert the Bad, Weezil
Animals: Horse
6026 King Leo
Minifigs: King Leo, Richard the Strong
Animals: Horse
6032 Catapult Crusher
Minifigs: Gilbert the Bad
6091/6098 King Leo's Castle
Minifigs: King Leo, Queen Leonora, Princess Storm, Richard the Strong, Lion Knight, Skeleton, Cedric the Bull, Gilbert the Bad, Weezil
Animals: Horse
6094 Guarded Treasury
Minifigs: Richard the Strong, Gilbert the Bad
6095 Royal Joust
Minifigs: King Leo, Richard the Strong, Cedric the Bull
Animals: 2 Horses
6096 Bull's Attack
Minifigs: Lion Knight, Cedric the Bull, Gilbert the Bad, Weezil
Animals: Horse
1286 Knights' Kingdom Cart
Minifigs: King Leo
1289 Knights' Kingdom Catapult
Minifigs: Weezil

Knights' Kingdom II (2004–2006)
Knights' Kingdom II was first officially announced in November 2003, in the English version of the Lego magazine. In spring 2004, the large action figures were released in Europe; several months later, they were released in America. Both continents obtained the playsets in the summer. Knights' Kingdom chronicles the legends of the Kingdom of Morcia, a fantasy world, and the adventures that take place within it. The main characters are the knights of the opposing factions. It is a revamped version of an earlier Knights' Kingdom Lego theme, featuring larger, action-figure like characters as well as more colourfully attired mini-figures in the traditional sets. While officially titled Knights' Kingdom on its packaging, it is popularly known as Knights' Kingdom II in order to differentiate it from the original theme which only included Lego mini-figures and featured different knight, king, and villain characters. It was also made into a trading card game and book series. 8877 Vladek's Dark Fortress was the largest set of this theme. 10176 King's Castle is part of this product line, but is not in the official storyline.

With the emergence of a new Castle line in 2007, the line was discontinued.

Castle II (2007–2009)
Released in May, 2007, the new Lego Castle line features a human faction led by a King fighting against an opposing undead skeleton faction ruled by an evil Necromancer. This was also the first series to have a royal family including a Queen and a Princess. It also included other minifigs such as a Champion (Gold Knight), a Court Wizard, and even a Jester. The human faction bears the emblem of a crown, leading to being nicknamed by buyers and Lego fans as the "Crownies". Their main color scheme is dark blue, light blue and gold. The undead faction has the emblem of a skull, and the army consists almost entirely of undead skeletons, mostly the normal white kind but also featuring a new black variant. Their color scheme consists of dark red and black. In 2008, Lego Castle introduced sets with orcs, trolls, and dwarves to add to the medieval fantasy theme. Excluding the Chess Set, the largest set of this theme is 10193 Medieval Market Village. The last sets of this incarnation of Castle were released in 2009 and were replaced by a new environment, Kingdoms, in 2010.

Kingdoms (2010–2012)
Kingdoms is the name of the Lego Medieval theme that was released June 2010 and replaced the fantasy-based Castle theme that had been in place since 2007. Kingdoms departs from the concept of a fantasy world inhabited by undead, orcs and dwarves; and returns to a more realistic world modeled after the European Middle Ages. The only fantasy elements are the wizard minifigures. Thus, it features sets that are more reminiscent of the early sets of the classic Castle theme from the 1980s. Indeed, the set 7946 King's Castle is modeled after the 6080 King's Castle set released in 1984.

In Kingdoms, there are two human factions pitted against each other. One side has the role of the attackers, featuring more vehicles and siege engines (The Green Kingdom/Dragon Knights). The other side has the role of the defenders with an emphasis on buildings (The Red Kingdom/Lion Knights). This theme, like the fantasy-era Castle theme of 2007, includes peasants and civilians, instead of concentrating solely on military factions.

Kingdoms is the first theme to include back-printing on the torsos of the minifigures. This theme featured new knight helms, new horse armor (a sleek-silhouette "unicorn" horse battle helmet), goats, and a new portcullis piece. Two unique horse prints are found only in Kingdoms sets: a pair of white horses with printed harnesses (7188 King's Carriage Ambush), and a dappled grey cart horse (7189 Mill Village Raid.) This theme also marked a return to the full-body rampant lion motif, rather than the lion head used in the Royal Knights, Knight's Kingdom I, and Knight's Kingdom II.

The final Kingdoms-themed sets were 10223 Kingdoms Joust, released on December 26, 2011; and 853373 Kingdoms Chess Set, released in 2012. The Kingdoms theme was discontinued in 2012, replaced by The Lord of the Rings franchise sets.

Castle III (2013)

Lego released a new Castle theme in autumn 2013 replacing the previously cancelled Kingdoms theme. It ended up being a very short-lived theme with only five sets released in late 2013 and two battlepacks released in early 2014. The two factions were "King's Knights", which wore blue with a crown insignia on their torsos and lion insignia on their shields and armor; and "Dragon Knights", in red and black. This theme was a fantasy-based theme with a wizard and a large dragon.

Standalone Castle Sets (2014-Present)
Although Lego has not released a new line of medieval-themed sets since the end of Castle III in 2013, Lego has released, under other lines, several standalone sets which are stylistically consistent with many of the previous Castle themes. These sets include:
850888 Castle Knights Accessory Set (2014) - Lego exclusive
10676 Knights' Castle (2014) - Lego Juniors series
5004419 Classic Knights Minifigure (2016) - Lego exclusive
71025 Fright Knight (2019) - Collectable minifigure
11940 Castle (2020) - Lego Creator theme (was a magazine gift only)
71027 Tournament Knight (2020) - Collectable minifigure
21325 Medieval Blacksmith (2021) - Lego Ideas series
31120 Medieval Castle (2021) - Lego Creator theme
40567 Forest Hideout (2022) - Lego Icons series
71032 Troubadour (2022) - Collectable minifigure
71034 Knight of the Yellow Castle (2022) - Collectable minifigure
10305 Lion Knights' Castle (2022) - Lego Icons series
71037 Falconer (2023) - Collectable minifigure

Theme park attractions 
In 1999, a Lego Castle themed land was introduced to Legoland California, featuring Castle Hill, Wild Woods Golf and Enchanted Walk.

In 2002, a Lego Castle themed land was introduced to Legoland Deutschland Resort, featuring Caterpillar Ride, Royal Joust, Fire Dragon, Dragon Hunt and Gold Panning.

In November 2021, a Lego Castle themed land was announced for the upcoming launch of Legoland Shanghai Resort in 2024.

Awards and nominations 
In 2005, Lego Knights’ Kingdom was awarded "Toy of the Year" and also "Boy Toy of the Year" by the Toy Association.

See also
Nexo Knights
Lego The Lord of the Rings
Lego Fusion
Lego Brawls

References

External links
Castle at Lego.com

Castle
Products introduced in 1978